Love, Live and Laugh is a 1929 American drama film directed by William K. Howard and written by Edwin J. Burke, Dana Burnet, and George Jessel. It is based on the 1922 play The Hurdy-Gurdy Man by Leroy Clemens and John B. Hymer. The film stars George Jessel, Lila Lee, David Rollins, Henry Kolker, John Loder, and John Reinhardt. The film was released on November 3, 1929, by Fox Film Corporation.

Cast     
George Jessel as Luigi
Lila Lee as Margharita
David Rollins as Pasquale Gallupi
Henry Kolker as Enrico
John Loder as Dr. Price
John Reinhardt as Mario
Dick Winslow as Mike 
Henry Armetta as Tony
Marcia Manon as Sylvia
Jerry Mandy as Barber

References

External links
 

1929 films
1920s English-language films
1929 drama films
Fox Film films
Films directed by William K. Howard
American black-and-white films
1920s American films